Wikimedia Ukraine is the regional chapter of the Wikimedia Foundation in Ukraine. The Chapter was created on May 31, 2009. On this day the First Annual Meeting was held and the Board was elected.

On July 3, 2009, the WMF approved Wikimedia Ukraine as its regional chapter.

On July 13, 2009, Wikimedia Ukraine received a certificate of registration of organization from the Ministry of Justice of Ukraine.

Board of Management 

, the Board comprises:
 Ilya Korniyko (Chair)
 Mykola Kozlenko (Treasurer)
 Bohdan Melnychuk (Secretary)
 Nataliia Lastovets
 Anton Obozhyn
 Olga Milianovych
 Ihor Makovskyi

See also 
 :m:Wikimedia Ukraine

References

External link 
 
 

 
Organizations based in Kyiv
Wiki communities